"Burn One Down" is a song written and performed by Ben Harper as the sixth track on his 1995 album Fight for Your Mind. The song has been called a "James-Taylor-meets-Bob-Marley moment" for Harper, and the song is a pro-marijuana anthem. It remains one of Harper's most performed songs live.

References

1995 songs
Ben Harper songs
Songs about cannabis
Songs written by Ben Harper